The Eastern League Top MLB Prospect Award is an annual award given to the best rookie player in Minor League Baseball's Eastern League based on their regular-season performance as voted on by league managers. Broadcasters, Minor League Baseball executives, and members of the media have previously voted as well. Though the league was established in 1938, the award was not created until 1993 as the Rookie of the Year Award. After the cancellation of the 2020 season, the league was known as the Double-A Northeast in 2021 before reverting to the Eastern League name in 2022. The Top MLB Prospect Award began to be issued instead of the Rookie of the Year Award in 2021.

Thirteen outfielders have won the award, the most of any position. First basemen, with seven winners, have won the most among infielders, followed by third basemen and shortstops (3) and second basemen (1). Two catchers and one pitcher have won the award.

Eleven players who have won the Top MLB Prospect Award also won the Eastern League Most Valuable Player Award (MVP) in the same season: Cliff Floyd (1993), Mark Grudzielanek (1994), Jay Payton (1995), Vladimir Guerrero (1996), Calvin Pickering (1998), Marlon Byrd (2001), Ryan Howard (2004), Jordan Brown (2007), Brandon Laird (2010), Darin Ruf (2012), and Cavan Biggio (2018). The only pitcher to win the award, Juan Acevedo (1994), also won the Pitcher of the Year Award in the same season.

Seven players from the Reading Fightin Phils have been selected for the Top MLB Prospect Award, more than any other team in the league, followed by the Harrisburg Senators (5); the Akron RubberDucks (4); the Binghamton Rumble Ponies (3); the Altoona Curve, Bowie Baysox, and New Haven Ravens (2); and the Erie SeaWolves, Hartford Yard Goats, New Hampshire Fisher Cats, Portland Sea Dogs, and Trenton Thunder (1).

Seven players from the Philadelphia Phillies Major League Baseball (MLB) organization have won the award, more than any other, followed by the Washington Nationals organization (5); the Cleveland Guardians organization (4); the New York Mets organization (3); the Baltimore Orioles, Colorado Rockies, and Pittsburgh Pirates organizations (2); and the Detroit Tigers, Miami Marlins, New York Yankees, St. Louis Cardinals, and Toronto Blue Jays organizations (1).

Winners

Wins by team

Active Eastern League teams appear in bold.

Wins by organization

Active Eastern League–Major League Baseball affiliations appear in bold.

References
Specific

General

Awards established in 1993
Minor league baseball trophies and awards
Top MLB Prospect
Rookie player awards